Dundalk Football Club is a professional association football club that competes in the League of Ireland Premier Division, the top tier of football in the Republic of Ireland. The club is based in Dundalk and its home ground is Oriel Park. The club crest is three martlets on a shield, which was adopted from the town's old coat of arms, and the team colours are white shirts and black shorts.

Founded in 1903 as Dundalk G.N.R., the works-team of the Great Northern Railway, they were a junior club until they were invited to join the Leinster Senior League in 1922–23. After playing at that level for four seasons, they were elected to the League of Ireland for the 1926–27 season. Six seasons later, they became the first club from outside Dublin to win the league title. They have won 49 trophies at national and all-Ireland level as of 2022, including four League and Cup 'Doubles', and are the only club to have won a league title or an FAI Cup in every decade since the 1930s. They are the second most successful club in the League's history (with 14 league titles), and are the most successful in the Premier Division era.

Dundalk are also the highest-ranked Irish club in European football as measured by UEFA club coefficients. They made their European debut in the 1963–64 European Cup and in that campaign, they became the first Irish side to win an away match in Europe. Their best performance in the European Cup was in 1979–80, when they reached the last 16. They then reached the last 16 of the European Cup Winners' Cup in 1981–82. They are the only Irish club to have qualified for the Europa League group stage twice and in 2016–17, they became the first team from Ireland to both win points and win a match at that level of European competition. They remain the only Irish team to have done so as of 2022–23.

History

Dundalk G.N.R. (1903–1930)

The Dundalk Great Northern Railway (G.N.R.) Football Club was established during the 1883–84 season as a rugby football club. They played their final rugby match in February 1903, and in September 1903 the club switched codes to association football, setting in motion their journey to become the modern-day Dundalk F.C. The new club, known locally as "the Railwaymen", adopted the Dundalk Athletic Grounds (a facility near the town centre shared by several sporting codes) as its home ground. They played challenge matches at first, then became founder members of the first Dundalk and District League (DDL), formed in 1906. There are no records of the club being active between 1907–08 and 1912–13, but they re-joined the local league in 1913–14 for what was the final season before the outbreak of World War I.

The DDL was dormant during the war, but the G.N.R. club entered both the Irish Junior Cup and Leinster Junior Cup competitions during the war years. After exiting the Irish Junior Cup in January 1917, the club appears to have been inactive again for the following two seasons. It re-formed for 1919–20, affiliated with the Leinster Football Association, and joined both the Newry and District League and the revived DDL. G.N.R. spent three seasons in the DDL, winning it twice, and also represented the district in both Junior Cup competitions each season. They reached the Leinster Junior Cup final in 1920 (the club's first knock-out competition final), which they lost to Avonmore after two replays.

Looking to progress, they were elected to the Leinster Senior League for 1922–23 to replace sides that had been promoted to the nascent Free State League. They played four seasons in that division, before being elected to the Free State League on 15 June 1926 to replace Dublin club Pioneers as the national league looked to spread to the provinces.

On 21 August 1926, they travelled to Cork to face Fordsons for their league debut, eventually finishing eighth in the 1926–27 season. By this stage, the team represented the G.N.R. works in name only and the club's management committee decided to make it independent of the company. New colours of white shirts and blue shorts with a crest of the town's coat of arms were adopted in December 1927. They contested their first final as a senior club in April 1929, the Leinster Senior Cup final, which they lost after a replay. It was the last time that the club was billed to appear as 'Dundalk G.N.R.', and the name of the club was formally changed to 'Dundalk A.F.C.' in the summer of 1930.

The works teams
When Dundalk G.N.R. joined the League of Ireland in 1926, it was one of four works-teams in the 10-team league—the others being Jacobs, St. James's Gate and Fordsons. Another railway works-team—Midland Athletic of the Midland Great Western Railway—had competed for two seasons but had resigned when the company went through a merger. By 1944–45, Dundalk were the only club with works-team roots remaining. Another works-team, Transport (sponsored by CIÉ), joined in 1948–49, but they failed to be re-elected for 1962–63, leaving Dundalk again as the only surviving club with works-team roots. The works themselves became Dundalk Engineering Works Ltd with the demise of the G.N.R.(I) company in 1958.

First successes (1930–1949)
With a new manager, Steve Wright, "doing everything except selling the programmes", Dundalk finished as runners-up in both the League and the FAI Cup in 1930–31. Proof that they could compete at a national level gave the management committee confidence to press ahead, and the club was converted to a membership-based limited company, 'Dundalk A.F.C. Limited', on 25 January 1932. In the 1932–33 season, they became the first team from outside Dublin to win a league title, sealing it in Dalymount Park with their first victory over Bohemians. The title win also meant that they had become the first team from outside Dublin or Belfast to win a league title in Ireland since the inception of the original Irish League in 1890. Hoping to improve gate receipts and revenue, the club's management committee decided to move from the Athletic Grounds to a ground of their own. In 1936, they secured land on the Carrick Road owned by P.J. Casey (a former committee member), and named it 'Oriel Park'.

After winning the league title, they were runners-up eight times across the five main competitions (League, Shield, FAI Cup, Dublin City Cup and Leinster Senior Cup), before winning the 1937–38 City Cup—their first cup final victory. They won their first FAI Cup—in their fourth appearance in the final—with victory over Cork United in Dalymount Park in 1942. Five weeks later, they won the inaugural Dublin and Belfast Inter-City Cup to become (unofficially) 'Champions of All Ireland'. The following September, in the new season, the City Cup was won for a second time.

During the mid-1940s, the management committee relied on player sales to English clubs to bankroll the club, as gate receipts alone did not meet its running costs. After missing out in both the League and the City Cup by a point in 1947–48, the committee decided to invest the surplus from its transfer dealings on a player-coach, Ned Weir, and a number of professional players from Scotland, in an attempt to attract larger attendances and win the trophies that had been beyond reach. The investment paid off when the City Cup was won for a third time at the start of the new season by topping its new league format unbeaten, while the club's second FAI Cup was won with victory over Shelbourne in the 1949 final. But the new team fell short in both the Shield and the League and, despite the cup double and improved gate receipts, the additional income was not enough to cover the increase in costs.

Struggles and recovery (1950–1964)
The attempt to maintain a full-time squad had not paid off and the 1949 cup-winning team was broken up. A surplus from transfer dealings prevented a more serious financial crisis arising, and despite the turnover in players, Dundalk won the Leinster Senior Cup for the first time in 1950–51. The cutbacks started to have an impact, and they finished second from bottom in the league table the following season. They went on a memorable FAI Cup run, however, coming from 3–1 down against Waterford in a semi-final replay to win 6–4 in extra time; then defeated Cork Athletic in the 1952 FAI Cup Final (also in a replay), to win the Cup for a third time.

Midway through the 1952–53 season, Club Secretary Sam Prole left to take over at Drumcondra. Prole, a Great Northern Railway employee, had played for Dundalk G.N.R. in junior football, and had been Secretary for 25 years. He had been responsible for the club's transfer activities, and player sales tailed off after his departure. The subsequent drop in income obliged the club to focus on controlling costs, and they finished last in the two seasons after he left. They continued to struggle for the rest of the decade, but, in contrast to their league form, they won their fourth FAI Cup with a 1–0 victory over Shamrock Rovers in the 1958 final.

Having not challenged for the League or Shield during the 1950s, they ended the decade at the top of the league table. Although they subsequently fell short of winning the title, it led to optimism that the lean years were coming to an end. A second Leinster Senior Cup was won in 1960–61, and a first league title in 30 years followed in 1962–63. That success meant that they entered European competition for the first time, where they became the first Irish side to win an away leg of a European tie, beating FC Zurich, 2–1, (in a 4–2 aggregate defeat) in the 1963–64 European Cup. Dundalk could not manage to retain the title that season, finishing as runners-up, and they were also runners-up in the Shield. But they did win the season-end Top Four Cup for the first time.

Takeover, rise and fall (1964–1974)
A poor 1964–65 followed, and the club's management committee decided that it was time to hire a modern-style manager, who would have sole responsibility for recruitment and player selection. They appointed Gerry Doyle, who had spent most of his career as both a player and a coach with Shelbourne. The new season saw little improvement, however, and with financial losses growing and investment in Oriel Park needed, it became clear early in the 1965–66 season that the membership-based ownership model could not provide the financial support required to take the club forward. A new public limited company took over in January 1966, after the voluntary liquidation of the old company.

The new board invested heavily in both Oriel Park and the squad ahead of the 1966–67 season, and signed a new player-coach, Alan Fox, from Bradford City. The pay-off was immediate. Dundalk finally won their first League of Ireland Shield, then charged to the league title, winning it by seven points, to seal the club's only League and Shield Double. They then won that season's Top Four Cup to complete the club's first 'treble'.

The following season, Oriel Park hosted European football for the first time, under newly installed floodlights, with the visit of Vasas SC of Hungary. But Fox fell out with the club's board during the trip to Budapest for the return leg, and he was released the following March, despite his side being set to retain the title. The Dublin City Cup of 1967–68 was his final success at the club. Dundalk subsequently finished as runners-up in the League, qualifying for the 1968–69 Fairs Cup, where they won a European tie for the first time with victory over DOS Utrecht. But fourth-place in the League that season, and another City Cup, was all that the remnants of Fox's team could achieve.

Future Ireland manager Liam Tuohy took over in the summer of 1969 and also joined the board, and as a result of his managerial experience, Dundalk entered the new decade at the top of the league table. But Tuohy was obliged to thin the squad and cut the wage bill because of the scale of the debts still hanging over the club from the redevelopment of Oriel Park, and he could not build a side able to sustain a title challenge. The 1971–72 Shield success would be the high point of his reign, and he quit at the end of that season, criticising a lack of local support in the process. His only other trophy at the club was the 1970–71 Leinster Senior Cup.

Dundalk had to sell or release a number of players to survive after Tuohy left, and they slid down the table—with a young, inexperienced team finishing second from bottom in 1972–73. To recover the situation, a new board took over the running of the club, and hired John Smith from Walsall as player-manager. After renegotiating the club's debts, they were able to provide Smith with funds to sign several players. Smith delivered a Leinster Senior Cup in his first season, but they subsequently fell away in the league after a good start, and Smith quit two matches into his second season for a job outside football. Following his departure, the club appointed Jim McLaughlin as player-manager in November 1974.

A trophy-laden era (1975–1995)

It was under McLaughlin that Dundalk recovered and reached a new level of success. With the remnants of Smith's squad and players unwanted elsewhere, he won his first league title (the club's fourth) in 1975–76, losing one match in the process. The title brought European football back to the town for the first time since 1969 and in the following season's European Cup, they met PSV Eindhoven and were deemed unlucky not to win the first leg at home. That match started an unbeaten run in Europe in Oriel Park of eight matches over the following five seasons. They ended the season by winning the Leinster Senior Cup, and a week later won the club's first FAI Cup since 1958 when they defeated Limerick United in the 1977 final.

League form had been mixed for the two seasons following the title and, despite winning their first League Cup and retaining the Leinster Senior Cup, a poor end to the 1977–78 league season led to rumours that McLaughlin would be let go. The club supported the "reorganisation" he demanded, however, and it used funds from the sale of three players to Liverpool to invest in the squad and make ground improvements at Oriel. McLaughlin's second league title followed in 1978–79, and they went on to defeat Waterford in the Cup final to complete the club's first League and Cup Double. The Double winning side's 1979–80 European Cup run the following season, where they narrowly missed out on qualifying for the quarter-finals (going down 3–2 on aggregate to Celtic), was the club's best European performance until 2016.

They finished as runners-up in the league for the next two seasons, and achieved their only domestic cup double in 1980–81—winning both the League Cup and the FAI Cup. McLaughlin's third and final league title at the club arrived in 1981–82, after an early season 10-point gap to Bohemians was overhauled. A trophy-less 1982–83 season, which saw Dundalk slip to third place in the league table behind Louth rivals Drogheda United, signalled that the team was entering a transition period. But McLaughlin resigned in May 1983, saying he needed a change.

After two seasons that ended in mid-table, former player Turlough O'Connor was appointed ahead of the League's split into two divisions in 1985–86. O'Connor quickly built a squad capable of challenging for honours and his sides consistently finished in the top four over the following eight seasons. They won the 1987 League Cup Final, and finished as runners-up in both the League and the FAI Cup to qualify for Europe for the first time in five years. The following season started with a visit from Cup Winners' Cup holders Ajax Amsterdam, and ended with the club's second League and Cup Double—with the title being won on the last day of the season, and the FAI Cup being won with victory over Derry City.

O'Connor won his second League Cup in 1989–90, and another league title followed in 1990–91 in an end of season, winner takes all match in Turner's Cross against Cork City. But Dundalk spurned an opportunity to progress in the European Cup, when a 1–1 draw away to Honved was followed by a 0–2 home defeat. Attendances started to drop noticeably during 1992–93, as the new English Premier League, broadcast live on BSkyB, was growing in popularity. By the end of the season the board was facing financial issues that threatened the club's survival—a "healthy" surplus in 1989, had become a serious deficit, with income falling due to some of the lowest gate receipts in memory. The 1993–94 season started with mixed results, with good away victories being followed by defeats at home and, after a home defeat to Monaghan United, O'Connor resigned.

He was replaced by another former player, Dermot Keely. The older players were released, and a thin squad struggled—missing out on the 'Top Six' round-robin that decided the title. They played out the final third of the season in a meaningless 'bottom six' round-robin in front of tiny crowds, which contributed to the worsening financial position. Early the following season the financial issues came to a head, and a number of local businessmen formed a new interim company to take the club over, saving it from bankruptcy. Despite the financial problems, and with a squad still lacking in depth, Keely led his team to the club's ninth league title on a dramatic final day. Starting the day in third place in the table, they needed to win their match at home and for both Shelbourne and Derry City to fail to win their games. They defeated Galway United and news eventually filtered through that both of their challengers had failed to win, confirming Dundalk as Champions.

Decline and upheaval (1995–2012)
The 1994–95 title did not halt the overall decline, and Keely did not see out the title defence, quitting midway through the 1995–96 season—reportedly frustrated at being unable to strengthen his squad. Dundalk sank down the table and had to survive a promotion/relegation play-off in 1996–97. The board turned to Jim McLaughlin to try to turn things around, but early in the 1998–99 season it was revealed that the club was in serious financial trouble again and the whole squad had been transfer listed. An end of season collapse saw the club drop from the top-tier for the first time, with relegation confirmed 20-years to the day after they had won their first Double.

Plans for a supporters' co-op to take the club over led to some optimism, and initial expectations were of an immediate return to the top-flight. But Dundalk became embroiled in a losing battle with the league's hierarchy and Kilkenny City, which reached the High Court, over the latter playing an improperly registered player. The following season the co-op invested heavily in the playing squad and, under new manager Martin Murray, they were promoted as 2000–01 First Division Champions. Although seemingly well-placed for the return to the top-flight, they were relegated again the following season, with the League being reduced from 12 teams to 10. Despite this setback, they won the club's ninth FAI Cup a week later, with victory over Bohemians in the final.

After being relegated again, Dundalk were stuck in the lower reaches of the First Division for the next four seasons. With no sign of promotion, the co-op members agreed to the club being taken back into private ownership by its CEO, Gerry Matthews. They finished second under new manager John Gill in 2006, securing a play-off tie against Waterford United. Even though they won the play-off, they were still denied a place in the 2007 Premier Division, with Galway United (who had finished third in that season's First Division) selected by the FAI's 2006 IAG Report to be promoted ahead of both Dundalk and Waterford. In 2008, they won promotion back to the Premier Division, pipping Shelbourne to the top spot on the final night of the season. Gill was let go, despite winning the First Division title.

At first, Dundalk stabilised their position back in the Premier Division—qualifying for the 2010–11 Europa League, leading the league table midway through the 2010 season, and reaching the 2011 Setanta Sports Cup final. But results subsequently deteriorated and, with financial losses mounting as the 2011 season drew to a close, Matthews decided to relinquish control of the club. With the club in danger of insolvency during a disastrous 2012, it was taken over by local businessmen Andy Connolly and Paul Brown (owners of the team's official sponsors, Fastfix), and Dundalk subsequently managed to remain in the top-flight by defeating Waterford United in the play-off.

Revival and dominance (2013–2019)

Having saved the club, the new owners turned to Stephen Kenny to become the new manager. They mounted an unexpected title challenge in his first season, eventually finishing as runners-up. Kenny kept the nucleus of the new side together for the following season, and went on to guide the club to its first league title since 1994–95. They also won that season's League Cup, the club's first League and League Cup Double. The 2015 season saw them dominate, winning the club's third League and FAI Cup Double—with the title being won by 11-points and the Cup with victory over Cork City in the final. They also won the Leinster Senior Cup—the club's first 'treble' since 1966–67. A third league title in a row was sealed with two games to spare in 2016.

2016 also saw the club qualify for the Champions League play-off round, after they first defeated FH of Iceland, then came from a goal down in the tie to defeat BATE Borisov 3–1 on aggregate. They drew Legia Warsaw for the play-off, with the first leg played in the Aviva Stadium in Dublin in front of a crowd of 30,417. They suffered a 2–0 defeat in the home leg, but shocked Legia in the return leg by taking a 1–0 lead. With Dundalk pushing for the equaliser that would have taken the tie to extra-time, Legia scored on the break, and won the tie 3–1 on aggregate. As a result, Dundalk qualified for the group stage of the Europa League. A draw with AZ Alkmaar in the Netherlands, followed by a victory over Maccabi Tel Aviv in Tallaght Stadium, were the first points earned by an Irish club in the group stage of European competition.

In 2017, after the European run, they won the League Cup again. The departure of some key players, and a slow start to the new season, meant that they slipped to runners-up spots in both league and FAI Cup. The club's European form had attracted interest from abroad, however, and a consortium of American investors led by Peak6 Investments LLC completed a takeover in January 2018. Kenny's side reasserted itself in 2018, winning another League and Cup Double—the second under Kenny and fourth in the club's history—breaking points-total and goals scored-total records in the process. In the aftermath, Kenny resigned in order to accept the Republic of Ireland U-21 manager's role.

Hoping to achieve continuity, the new owners replaced Kenny with his Assistant Manager, Vinny Perth, as Head Coach, with John Gill returning as First-team coach. Despite falling 13-points behind early 2019 leaders Shamrock Rovers in April, they overhauled the deficit within weeks, and subsequently won the club's 14th league title with four games to spare. They also won the League Cup by defeating Derry City on penalties in the final, to secure a second League and League Cup Double. They were denied a first domestic Treble of League, FAI Cup and League Cup, however, when they were beaten in a penalty shoot-out in the FAI Cup Final. But they ended the season with a comprehensive 7–1 aggregate victory over Northern Irish champions, Linfield, in the inaugural Champions Cup.

Transition (2020–present)
Early the following season, a goal scored by Jordan Flores went viral and was subsequently nominated for the FIFA Puskás Award. Soon after, the outbreak of the COVID-19 pandemic saw the cessation of football in line with other European countries. The season resumed with a reduced schedule of 18 matches in total and matches being played behind closed doors. Manager Vinny Perth was dismissed following Dundalk's exit from Europe in the first qualifying round of the 2020–21 UEFA Champions League. He was replaced by Italian Filippo Giovagnoli. Dundalk subsequently qualified for the group stage of the 2020–21 Europa League after victories over Inter Club d'Escaldes, Sheriff Tiraspol and KÍ Klaksvik in the qualifying rounds. They were drawn in Group B alongside Arsenal, Rapid Wien, and Molde. They failed to pick up any points and finished bottom of the group.

In the FAI Cup, they had an 11–0 semi-final victory over Athlone Town—setting a new record for the biggest win in the competition's history, which was also a new club record victory. They followed that with a 4–2 extra-time victory over Shamrock Rovers, with David McMillan scoring a hat-trick, to win the Cup for the twelfth time and qualify for Europe for the 25th time.

The 2021 season saw Shane Keegan named first-team manager, with Giovagnoli reverting to the position of 'coach' because he did not have a UEFA Pro Licence. The season began with a victory in the President's Cup, but after a run of defeats at the start of the league campaign, both Keegan and Giovagnoli left the club. After a period where new Sporting Director Jim Magilton took charge, Vinny Perth returned to the club as head coach in June on a short-term deal. Dundalk struggled for the remainder of the domestic season with their lowest league finish since 2012 and went out to Vitesse Arnhem, 4–3 on aggregate, in the third qualifying round of the inaugural Europa Conference League. Before the season ended, the club was returned to local ownership when a consortium led by former co-owner Andy Connolly and sports technology firm STATSports agreed a takeover with Peak6. The new owners then installed former captain Stephen O'Donnell as the club's new head coach in the close season. O'Donnell steered his new-look side to a third place finish and qualification for the Europa Conference League at the first attempt.

Crest and colours

Crest history

After outgrowing its links with the Great Northern Railway, the football club adopted the then coat of arms of the town of Dundalk (three gold martlets on an azure field) in December 1927 and incorporated the crest on the club's new white playing shirts. This coat of arms had been adopted by the town in 1673 when it was granted a charter under Charles II of England. It appears as the 'Corporation Seal' in a town plan dated 1675. The crest disappeared from the playing shirts in 1930, however, after the urban district council proposed to remove the "three black crows" from the seal of the town. A modified crest was reintroduced to the shirt for the 1952 FAI Cup Final, consisting of three black martlets on a white shield bearing the club name. After a number of minor redesigns in the following years, the white shield became a red shield with white martlets in 1997, and in 2015 this crest was modified to incorporate a gold star, to commemorate Dundalk's tenth League of Ireland title.

Kit history
Dundalk's colours have been white shirts with black shorts and black or white socks since the start of the 1940–41 season. It is known that the Dundalk G.N.R. club wore blue shirts when it started in 1903. and were reported to be wearing "yellow and black" in 1906, but there is no further evidence of defined club colours in the pre-World War I years. When the club was revived for the 1919–20 season, the colours adopted were black and amber-striped shirts with white shorts. In advance of dropping the 'G.N.R.' moniker and becoming 'Dundalk A.F.C.', the club changed to a strip of white shirts with the coat of arms of the town (the old Dundalk Corporation seal) as its crest, and blue shorts matching the azure shield of the crest. The new colours were first worn on St Stephen's Day 1927 in the opening match of the 1927–28 League of Ireland Shield.

This combination was worn until 1939 but came to be seen as unlucky due to the number of cup final defeats Dundalk had during the 1930s.
Hoping a change would bring more luck, the club introduced a sky blue and maroon quartered shirt with white shorts and maroon socks in 1939–40, but they promptly lost to non-league opposition in the first round of that season's FAI Cup, and went back to wearing white shirts for the following season, this time paired with black shorts. Possibly by coincidence, when the clubs of the town amalgamated to form the first Dundalk Association Football Club in 1904, the colours chosen were "white shirt, bearing the Dundalk coat of arms, and black pants". The 'home' colours have remained essentially unchanged with red trims being incorporated occasionally since the 1990s. An all-white kit was introduced for the first time in the 1965–66 season, and was also the combination used in 1973–74 and 2003. All-white kits are still worn occasionally when required to avoid kit clashes.

Away colours
The earliest photographic record of the team in 'away' colours comes from the 1928–29 season. For their first visit to play Fordsons after adopting white shirts, Dundalk were obliged to wear borrowed shirts with their own navy blue shorts and black socks, as the home side also wore white shirts. For the next two seasons, they wore their old black and amber-striped shirts when travelling to face teams wearing white.

The club did not have an official away kit until 1977–78. In the interim, red shirts were worn if change colours were needed. An all-red kit was produced for the Cup Winners' Cup tie away to Hajduk Split in 1977 and this became the away kit for domestic games that season. An all-red away kit was worn against Tottenham Hotspur in 1981 but otherwise official away colours were not required again until the 1990–91 season, when all-red was again adopted. Since then, away kits have usually been based on red or black. The club has twice introduced away colours that pay homage to its G.N.R. roots—in 2016 and again in 2021.

Prior to 2019, ad hoc third colours had been worn by the team only when both home and away kits clashed with an opponent's colours. An official commercially available third kit was introduced that season for the first time—an all-lilac strip with white and black trim. It was designed by then kit supplier CX+ Sport, as part of a fundraising partnership between the club and Temple Street Children's University Hospital. The logo of the charity replaced that of the official sponsor Fyffes on the chest of the shirt. This kit was worn in all rounds of the successful 2019 League Cup campaign, and in the early rounds of that season's FAI Cup.

Kit suppliers
The club's kit supplier is Playr-Fit, who signed a three-year deal beginning with the 2023 season. They replaced Umbro, who had been the supplier between 2007 and 2015, and between 2020 and 2022. Previous suppliers include Dundalk-based companies CX+ Sport (2016–2019) and Eros Sportswear (1985–1988). O’Neills (1976–1984; 1990–2004) have also been a long-term supplier. Erreà (2005) and Diadora (2006) have each been suppliers for one season while Adidas Teamwear was used temporarily during 1982–83. A Cork-based company, Union Sport, supplied kits for two seasons (1988–89 and 1989–90). Their products were notable in that the company used a Confederate flag (the Battle Flag of the Army of Northern Virginia) as its logo, which featured prominently on team shirts and other apparel.

Home grounds

Athletic Grounds
Between 1903 and 1936, Dundalk mostly played at the Athletic Grounds near the town centre (land which was eventually sold in 1959 for a factory development). The Athletic Grounds were owned by the Dundalk Young Ireland's Athletic Grounds Company and made available for all local team sports. Dundalk's matches were usually played on Sundays, enabling a large Northern Irish contingent of spectators (inconvenienced by Sunday Observance laws) to attend games. When matches were moved to Saturdays because of Sundays being unavailable, the club suffered financially from lower gate receipts. If the Athletic Grounds were unavailable altogether, then matches were played at the grounds of the Dundalk Educational Institution (now Dundalk Grammar School), the grounds at St Mary's College, or the Carroll's Recreation Ground.

Oriel Park

In 1936, the club moved permanently to land on the Carrick Road made available by former committee member P.J. Casey on a long-term land lease and named the new ground "Oriel Park". Almost 10 years to the day after Dundalk G.N.R. played their first Free State League match away to Fordsons, the same club (as Cork F.C.) were the first visitors to Oriel Park, with the home team winning 2–1. Oriel's attendance record is an estimated 18,000, set in 1982 for Dundalk's European Cup Winners' Cup second round tie against Tottenham Hotspur F.C. On occasions when Oriel has been unavailable due to works, matches have been moved to either United Park in Drogheda or Gortakeegan in Monaghan. The ground has had an artificial playing surface since 2005.
Home grounds for European matches
Dundalk played their first home European match, against F.C. Zurich in the 1963–64 European Cup, in Dalymount Park in Dublin—as Oriel Park did not have floodlights. Floodlighting was installed in 1967 to allow matches to be played there—the first being the visit of Vasas SC of Hungary in the 1967–68 European Cup. The 1995–96 UEFA Cup tie against Malmö was moved to United Park in Drogheda as the Oriel pitch was being re-laid that summer, and the 2002–03 UEFA Cup tie against Varteks was moved to Tolka Park in Dublin because Oriel did not meet UEFA's upgraded standards for football stadiums at that time.

Oriel has since been upgraded to a Category 2 Stadium, able to accommodate 3,100 seated spectators for European matches. Matches requiring a ground to have Category 3 status have been played in Tallaght Stadium and matches requiring a ground meeting Category 4 status have been played at the Aviva Stadium.

Supporters
The Supporters Club is called 'The 1903', in honour of the football club's year of formation. There is also a Ladies Supporters Club, the 'Lilywhite Ladies'. The Dundalk G.N.R. club's members formed its first Supporters Club during the 1928–29 season. The Supporters Clubs have raised vital funds in support of the club through the decades, money that was often required to keep the club viable.

Dundalk fans have nicknamed the team 'the Lilywhites' and supporters also use 'the Town' as shorthand for the club. Both nicknames have been in use since at least the 1950s. The hashtag #CmonTheTown is used by fans on social media. From when the club was first formed until its change of colours in 1927–28, the team's nickname was 'the Railwaymen'. Later, the team was known as 'the Northerners", or 'the Bordermen' (due to the town's location close to the border with Northern Ireland).

The current generation of fans—who followed the club out of the First Division, through the ownership crisis of 2012, and into the subsequent successful period—style themselves the 'Shedside Army'. They are responsible for Oriel's 'tifo' displays. One such display—the flying of Palestinian flags in Oriel Park during a Europa League tie—resulted in a UEFA fine for Dundalk of €18,000. Supporters have two mottoes: "We See Things They'll Never See" owing to the roller-coaster of highs and lows the club has experienced; and "Dundalk Will Never Die But You Will", a riff on a Mogwai album title. The club anthem has become Three Little Birds by Bob Marley and the Wailers (both because of the club crest and because of the sentiments expressed in the lyrics).

Support base and attendances

The club's support base extends beyond the town of Dundalk itself, including its hinterland and even into south Armagh and County Down. It takes in the Dundalk Municipal District in north Louth, which comprises the towns of Dundalk, Carlingford and Blackrock; the Ardee Municipal District in mid-Louth, which comprises the towns of Ardee and Dunleer; the east Monaghan district of Castleblaney-Carrickmacross; and the south Armagh part of the Newry and Mourne district. The total population of this area is approximately 100,000. The average Friday night home league attendances is approximately 3,000, with attendances at 'bigger' matches of approximately 4,000.

Rivalries
The Louth Derby is contested between Dundalk and Drogheda United, who entered the League of Ireland in 1963. The clubs played an annual friendly from 1966 to 1984—the Donegan Cup, presented by former Louth TD Paddy Donegan. Apart from one attempt to revive the contest in 1990, it was dropped as the two clubs could not find suitable dates for it during the season after the split of the League of Ireland into two divisions. The friendly was reintroduced as a pre-season match in 1997 with a new trophy—the Jim Malone Cup, in honour of three-time chairman of the board, the late Jim Malone.

While there is a sibling rivalry between the two towns, Derbies are not usually antagonistic because the two clubs have rarely competed for top honours simultaneously, although they did meet in the final of the 1971–72 League of Ireland Shield, with Dundalk winning 5–0. Many of Dundalk's most successful periods have corresponded with Drogheda being at the lower end of the league table or in the First Division, while Drogheda's most successful period (between 2004 and 2008) occurred while Dundalk were in the lower tier. The derby has been fractious on occasion, however, particularly during cup ties between the sides. In addition to the Louth Derby, Dundalk fans would see Shamrock Rovers as their biggest rivals, as Rovers hold the record for the most league titles and the record for the most FAI Cups, with Dundalk next in the honours list for both competitions.

Ownership and finances
The club is currently owned by a private company trading as 'Dundalk Town FC Limited'. The trading company is owned by a consortium of investors led by Andy Connolly and sports technology firm STATSports.

Ownership history
As an association football club for the employees of the Great Northern Railway works in the town, it was 'owned' by the company and run by a management committee elected by its members. The club was converted to a membership-based limited company, 'Dundalk Association Football Club Limited', on 25 January 1932. This brought it under the ownership of its supporters, who elected a management committee every two years. This ownership structure survived until the end of 1965 but by then, the club's liabilities had grown and Oriel Park was in need of investment. The membership-based model, which saw the club break even on an annual basis at best, could not provide the required finance and the company was voluntarily liquidated and taken over by a public limited company, 'Dundalk Football Club Limited', in January 1966.

The financial issues that occurred in late 1994, which saw the club become effectively insolvent, forced the liquidation of the 1966 company. It was taken over by 'Dundalk AFC Interim Limited', a new holding company comprising former and current directors under chairman Enda McGuill. But the solvency issues that had faced the club through most of the 1990s arose again in 1998, resulting in relegation that season for the first time in the club's history. It was taken over by the 'Dundalk F.C. Co-operative' in 2000, returning it to a membership-based, supporter-owned model. But the co-op was unable to make the sort of investment in either the team or in Oriel Park required to bring the club back to the Premier Division. They decided to sell the training ground, Hiney Park, in order to service debts and pay for work at Oriel.

The man who purchased Hiney Park, Gerry Matthews, was subsequently invited to join the board as CEO in 2006. He then took the club into private ownership as 'Dundalk FC Limited' when it was accepted that the co-op could not continue to support it. It was returned to a solid footing under the ownership of Matthews but his decision to end his financial support in 2012 lead to another threat of insolvency. With the assistance of the Dundalk FC Supporters Trust, the club was rescued by the owners of its official sponsors, Fastfix—Paul Brown and Andy Connolly. They formed a new trading company 'Dundalk Town FC Limited' and completed a takeover in time for the 2013 season. Brown and Connolly then sold their interest to a consortium of investors led by the American investment firm Peak6 in 2018. At the end of the 2021 season, the club was returned to local ownership when a group led by the returning Connolly and the owners of sports technology firm STATSports agreed a takeover deal with Peak6.

Sponsorship and income streams
Dundalk's first shirt sponsor became National Aluminium with the introduction of shirt sponsorship in 1980. The company's brand remained on the team's shirts until 1984. From 1987 until 2002, the official sponsor was Harp Lager (the brand being synonymous with the town, and the Great Northern Brewery, where the product was brewed, being near Oriel Park). Subsequently, the club had a number of official sponsors, including a sponsorship deal with Fyffes, which ran from 2012 until 2020.

For the 2023 season, the team playing shirt's chest logo is that of official sponsors Bet Regal. The shirt's sleeve and upper back sponsor is (Renault) Blackstone Motors and the lower back of the shirt is sponsored by StatSport and Fastfix. The full list of sponsors for 2023 are:
Bet Regal (Official Sponsor)
Renault Blackstone Motors
Statsports
Fastfix
Playr-Fit (Official kit supplier)
Sportsfile
UHY Farrelly Dawe Whyte

There are several other sponsorship arrangements, such as sponsorship of individual players, and sponsorship of individual home matches. The club's Lotto is managed in partnership with Clubforce.

There is a merchandise shop at Oriel Park and an online store on the official website. In addition to sponsorship, Oriel Park is made available for junior and schools football, and is also available for rent to private groups and clubs in other sporting codes. The ground's public bar, 'The Lilywhite Lounge', is available for social events, as is the members' bar—the 'Enda McGuill Suite'.

The club introduced a membership scheme for supporters in 2020. The scheme is run on a monthly subscription basis via Patreon.

Player transfers
Players in the League of Ireland are typically signed on single season contracts, meaning they become free agents at the end of each season. Contracts of two-year duration are less typical; while players and clubs rarely sign deals of a longer duration. As a result, the transfer-fee inflation seen throughout European club football has not been a feature of the game in Ireland, and Dundalk have not benefited financially from player transfers since the Bosman ruling came into effect. Indeed, the PFAI Players' Player of the Year for 2015 (Richie Towell), and 2016 (Daryl Horgan), both left for EFL Championship clubs at the end of their respective award-winning seasons on free transfers, due to contract expiry.

Transfer fees both paid and received have generally remained undisclosed. The record transfer fee received (when all clauses were eventually triggered and paid) was approximately £80,000 (equivalent to €200,000 in 2019) for Steve Staunton, who was signed by Liverpool in August 1986 for an initial fee of £20,000. Dundalk subsequently received a further estimated £70,000 (equivalent to €150,000 in 2019) when Staunton was transferred by Liverpool to Aston Villa in 1991.

Media

Television and radio
Ireland's State-owned public service broadcaster, RTÉ, has broadcast rights for League of Ireland and FAI Cup matches as part of a package from the FAI that includes international matches. However, there is little or no income derived from these rights for clubs. Indeed, the network refused to pay the fee asked to broadcast the home leg of Dundalk's Champions League victory against BATE Borisov in 2016, a few months after they had been named RTÉ's "Team of the Year" for 2015. RTÉ had also previously offered the FAI €4 million to avoid having to televise any League of Ireland matches on its channels at all.

Live commentary of matches is broadcast on Dundalk FM (a community radio station) and LMFM. The radio broadcasts do not have licensing restrictions and can be accessed online in Ireland and globally from the stations' websites.

Online
Historically, live online streaming of domestic games was limited to pilot programs and streams run by online gambling companies. As a result of the COVID-19 pandemic during the 2020 season, which resulted in matches being played behind closed doors, the WatchLOI service was introduced by the FAI and RTÉ. The service made all games not already due to be broadcast on television available for streaming worldwide on a subscription basis.

The WatchLOI service was discontinued in June 2021 and replaced by 'LOITV', with clubs being responsible for producing their own live match coverage.

Club publications
The club's official website, dundalkfc.com, has been voted 'Website of the Year' by the Soccer Writers Association of Ireland on eight occasions, most recently for 2021.

A matchday programme is produced for all home matches—the "DFC Magazine". This programme was voted 'Programme of the Year' for 10 of the 12 seasons between 2008 and 2019 by the Irish Football Programme Club. In 2017 the Louth County Museum celebrated the achievements of the club with a new exhibition entitled "One Team, One Dream", which ran for over a year. In 2018 a short documentary entitled "Chasing Doubles" was published on YouTube by Dundalk Sport and Lightstorm Media. The piece was nominated by the FAI for a "Best Digital Initiative Award", as part of the association's "Communications Awards" in July 2019.

In addition, the following books have been published:

 2003: The History of Dundalk F.C. — The First 100 Years, by Jim Murphy
 2013: C'mon The Town! A Dundalk FC Miscellany, by Jim Murphy
 2014: CHAMP10NS, by Gavin McLaughlin
 2015: The Double, by Gavin McLaughlin 
 2016: Making History, by Gavin McLaughlin
 2018: Taking Back the Throne, by Gavin McLaughlin
 2019: We See Things They'll Never See, by Gavin McLaughlin
 2020: Dundalk Football Club: In Black And White, by Daniel Sexton

Players

First-team squad
As of 22 February 2023.

 (on loan from HJK Helsinki)

 (on loan from Swansea City)

 (on loan from West Bromwich Albion)

Out on loan

 (at Dungannon Swifts until the end of the 2022–23 season)

Youth teams
Dundalk maintains an academy with youth teams in the U-14, U-15, U-17, and U-19 age brackets of the League of Ireland, in partnership with Malahide United of the Leinster Senior League.

Women's teams
Dundalk do not currently have a women's team in the Women's National League (Ireland) formed in 2011. Teams are maintained at Under-17 and Uner-19 level.

Prior to the formation of the WNLI, a loosely affiliated club, Dundalk City L.F.C., experienced success in the Dublin Women's Soccer League during the 2000–2005 period, culminating in victory in the 2005 Women's FAI Cup Final. The club later split over a proposed full merger with Dundalk F.C. and subsequently, both Dundalk City and Dundalk W.F.C. became defunct. Dundalk F.C. also maintains a girls team at Under 15 level.

Scholarships
A sports scholarship, run by Dundalk Institute of Technology (DkIT) in partnership with the club, "is aimed at those candidates who wish to pursue a full-time third level education whilst simultaneously pursuing a professional soccer playing career with League of Ireland Champions Dundalk FC".

Former players

International players

Personnel

Technical staff
As of 19 January 2023.

Source:

Club officials

Source:

Former managers

Records

The record for the most appearances in all competitions is currently held by Tommy McConville, who appeared in 580 matches in two stints at the club between 1964 and 1986. A number of players have won five league titles—Martin Lawlor being the first to reach the mark. Joey Donnelly is the top goalscorer with 142 goals in all competitions. Five other players—Eddie Carroll, Joe Martin, Jimmy Hasty, Paddy Turner, and Patrick Hoban—have also scored 100 goals or more. Hoban broke Donnelly's club record for league goals during the 2019 season and subsequently became the first Dundalk player to score 100 league goals for the club during the 2022 season.

Bob Egan became the first Dundalk player to win an international cap on 20 April 1929, when he represented Ireland in a 4–0 defeat of Belgium. The player who has won the most caps while at the club is Billy O'Neill, who won 11 caps for Ireland—his international career being cut short at the age of 23 by the outbreak of World War II. Mick Fairclough was the most recently capped player, earning two caps in May 1982. In 2021, Raivis Jurkovskis and Sonni Nattestad became the first Dundalk players to be capped for a country other than Ireland while at the club.

Dundalk's record win is an 11–0 victory over Athlone Town in the 2020 FAI Cup. The record league win is 9–0, achieved against Jacobs in 1932, and again against Shelbourne in 1980. The biggest victory in a European match is 4–0, achieved with home wins against Fram Reykjavík in the 1981–82 European Cup Winners' Cup, and Newtown in the 2021–22 UEFA Europa Conference League.

The record home attendance is 30,417 v Legia Warsaw in the Aviva Stadium, Dublin for the Champions League play-off round in 2016.

European competition

Dundalk made their European debut in the 1963–64 European Cup and in that campaign, they became the first Irish side to win an away match in Europe. Their best performance in the European Cup was in 1979–80, when they reached the last 16, and they reached the last 16 of the European Cup Winners' Cup in 1981–82. They have qualified twice for the Europa League group stage and they became the first team from Ireland to both win points and win a match at that level of European competition in 2016–17. The 2021–22 UEFA Europa Conference League was their 25th European campaign.

They have played against several major names in European football such as Liverpool, Tottenham Hotspur, Arsenal, Celtic, FC Porto, PSV Eindhoven, Ajax, Red Star Belgrade, Hajduk Split, Legia Warsaw, and Zenit St Petersburg. They have faced opponents from the Netherlands most often, having played ties against PSV, Ajax, DOS Utrecht, AZ Alkmaar, and Vitesse Arnhem.

The club is now the highest-ranked Irish club in European football in terms of UEFA club coefficients. In a January 2021 ranking compiled by statistical analysis site FiveThirtyEight, Dundalk were ranked 290th in 'International Club Soccer'.

Overall European record.
As of 12 August 2021.

Honours

Source:

References
Footnotes

Bibliography

Citations

External links

Dundalk F.C. Who's Who (Historical player database)
The 1903 Dundalk F.C. Supporters Club
The Lilywhite Ladies Supporters Club

 
Association football clubs established in 1903
Association football clubs in County Louth
League of Ireland Premier Division clubs
Sport in Dundalk
1903 establishments in Ireland
Former Leinster Senior League clubs
Railway association football teams in Ireland